Aimar Hazar Sher (born 20 December 2002) is a Swedish professional footballer who plays as a midfielder for Eredivise club Groningen, on loan from Spezia.

Early life
Sher was born in Iraq, but moved to Sweden at age four together with his family. 

He grew up in Stockholm and started to play football as a youngster with local clubs Mälarhöjdens IK and Enskede IK, before joining the academy of Hammarby IF in 2013. Sher was part of the Hammarby side that won the U17's Swedish championship in 2019.

Club career

Hammarby IF
On 21 August 2019, Sher made his competitive debut for Hammarby IF in a 3–1 away win against IFK Luleå in Svenska Cupen. The next month, on 25 September, Sher made his league debut for the club, coming on as a late substitute in a 3–1 away win against IK Sirius in Allsvenskan. He became Hammarby's youngest Allsvenskan debutant so far at age 16 and nine months, surpassing the former record holder Isac Lidberg. Sher signed his first professional contract with Hammarby on 20 November 2019.

On 5 August 2020, Sher signed a new two-year contract with Hammarby after establishing himself in the first-team squad. He scored his first competitive goal for the club on 1 November the same year, a stoppage-time equaliser in a 1–1 home draw against BK Häcken. In his full debut season, Sher played 21 games, although the side disappointedly finished 8th in the table.

On 30 May 2021, Sher won the 2020–21 Svenska Cupen with Hammarby IF, through a 5–4 win on penalties (0–0 after full-time) against BK Häcken in the final, where he scored his attempt.

Spezia
On 19 August 2021, Sher transferred to Spezia in the Serie A, for a reported fee of around €1,5 million, signing a five-year contract. On 3 October, he made his competitive debut for the club in a 0–4 home loss against Hellas Verona.

Loan to Groningen
On 17 January 2023, Sher was loaned by FC Groningen in the Netherlands.

International career
Sher scored in his debut for the Swedish U17 national team in a 1–2 friendly loss against Denmark on 18 April 2018.

On 7 September 2021, Sher made his debut for the Swedish U21 national team, coming on as a substitute in a 1–1 away draw against Bosnia and Herzegovina, in the qualification to the 2023 UEFA European Under-21 Championship.

Personal life
His first name is an homage to the Argentinian former football player Pablo Aimar.

Career statistics

Club

Honours
Hammarby IF
 Svenska Cupen: 2020–21

References

External links

2002 births
People from Kirkuk
Living people
Association football midfielders
Sweden youth international footballers
Sweden under-21 international footballers
Iraqi footballers
Iraqi emigrants to Sweden
Swedish people of Iraqi descent
Allsvenskan players
Ettan Fotboll players
Serie A players
Hammarby Fotboll players
IK Frej players
Spezia Calcio players
FC Groningen players
Swedish expatriate footballers
Expatriate footballers in Italy
Swedish expatriate sportspeople in Italy
Expatriate footballers in the Netherlands
Swedish expatriate sportspeople in the Netherlands